Mamiña is a small village located  east from Iquique at 2800 metres (9.340 ft.) above sea level in the foothills of Los Andes Mountain range in northern Chile. Famous for its many hot springs that reach surface at 70 Cº, which are claimed to be beneficial for skin and bones. It has some hotels and hostels and basic services.

References 

Hot springs of Chile
Populated places in El Tamarugal Province